Laura Elizabeth Jackson (born 27 December 1997) is an English cricketer who currently plays for Lancashire, Cumbria, North West Thunder and Manchester Originals. An all-rounder, she is a right-handed batter and right-arm medium bowler. She has previously played for Cheshire.

Domestic career
Jackson made her county debut in 2015, for Cheshire against Oxfordshire. She took six wickets in her first County Championship season, at an average of 16.50.

Jackson joined Lancashire ahead of the 2016 season, but did not become a regular for the side until the 2018 season. She was the side's leading wicket-taker in the 2018 Women's Twenty20 Cup, with 9 wickets at an average of 15.33. In 2019, Jackson played one County Championship match for Cumbria, against Scotland, and took 7 wickets for 9 runs off her 10 overs, all bowled, as Scotland were all out for 72. Due to this performance, she was Cumbria's leading wicket-taker in the County Championship. She was also Lancashire's leading wicket-taker in the Twenty20 Cup, with 6 wickets at an average of 14.66. She took two wickets for the side at an average of 11.50 in the 2021 Women's Twenty20 Cup. Jackson played for Cumbria in the 2022 Women's Twenty20 Cup, taking three wickets at an average of 29.00.

In 2020, Jackson played for North West Thunder in the Rachael Heyhoe Flint Trophy. She appeared in three matches, scoring 23 runs and taking 2 wickets at an average of 21.50. Her best performance came against Northern Diamonds, where she hit 22 runs and took 2/23 from 9 overs. In 2021, she took four wickets for the side in the Rachael Heyhoe Flint Trophy and one in the Charlotte Edwards Cup. She also played four matches for Manchester Originals in The Hundred, taking four wickets. At the end of the 2021 season, it was announced that Jackson had signed a professional contract with North West Thunder. She played 12 matches for North West Thunder in 2022, across the Charlotte Edwards Cup and the Rachael Heyhoe Flint Trophy, taking 11 wickets. She was again in the Manchester Originals squad in The Hundred, but did not play a match.

References

External links

1997 births
Living people
People from Ormskirk
Cheshire women cricketers
Lancashire women cricketers
Cumbria women cricketers
North West Thunder cricketers
Manchester Originals cricketers